The 2023 FIU Panthers football team will represent Florida International University (FIU) as a member of Conference USA (C-USA) during the 2023 NCAA Division I FBS football season. The Panthers will be led by second-year head coach Mike MacIntyre and play home games at the Riccardo Silva Stadium in Westchester, Florida.

Schedule
FIU and Conference USA announced the 2023 football schedule on January 10, 2023.

References

FIU
FIU Panthers football seasons
FIU Panthers football